Ellie Kim, artist name SuperKnova, is a physician, singer, activist and musician. She has released two studio albums, most recently American Queers. As a physician, she is noted for speaking out publicly against non-consensual intersex surgery in infants while working at Lurie Children’s Hospital in Chicago, Illinois.

Education 
Kim attended the University of Illinois Urbana-Champaign where she studied jazz guitar. She attended Northwestern University's Feinberg School of Medicine and graduated with her MD in 2019. She did not attend residency and instead chose to pursue a career in music after graduating.

Music career 
Ellie Kim started SuperKnova while in medical school. During this time, she began her gender transition and wrote songs as a form of therapy to process her emotions around coming out. She initially did not plan on releasing them. However, a friend eventually convinced her to put them on Bandcamp. Her first album Splendor Dysphoria was released on Bandcamp in June 2017. She chose the artist name SuperKnova based on her childhood fascination with space. The name is based on the cosmological phenomenon of a supernova, the final most energetic explosion before the death of a star. She saw this as an analogy of how she wanted to live life: giving it her all and seeing beauty in the chaos. Her second album American Queers is one of the “all-time best selling transgender albums” on Bandcamp.

Production 
Kim is a singer, multi-instrumentalist, producer and audio engineer. She writes, produces, records, mixes and masters all of her own music.

Activism 
As a physician, Kim has advocated for intersex justice alongside activist Pidgeon Pagonis. On July 23, 2020, Kim became the first physician at Lurie Children’s Hospital to publicly speak out against cosmetic, medically unnecessary surgeries performed on intersex infants without their consent. She advocated for change within Lurie Children's Hospital in collaboration with Dr. Robert Garofalo, division head of Adolescent Medicine. On July 29, 2020, Lurie Children’s hospital formally changed their policy regarding intersex infant surgery and became the first hospital in the United States to do so.

Personal life 
Kim is a genderfluid, transgender woman and uses she/her/hers pronouns.

Appearances in media 
SuperKnova's song "Glitter and Blood" appears in Season 1, Episode 2 of Showtime's Work in Progress. She also sings a cover of The Beat's "Mirror in the Bathroom" (produced by Ethan Stoller) that appears in Season 1, Episode 4, the "Bathroom" episode.

Awards 
In 2021, SuperKnova's music video for her song "Goals_" was selected to the 44th Asian American International Film Festival in New York City.

References 

Transgender women musicians
American LGBT singers
LGBT physicians
Intersex rights activists
LGBT people from Illinois
Year of birth missing (living people)
Living people
Transgender singers
Genderfluid people